Phaulactis is an extinct genus of rugose coral that existed  during the Ordovician, Silurian and Devonian periods. It can be found in Europe, North America, Asia and Australia. Phaulactis was described by Ryder in 1926.

Description
All members of this genus are horn-shaped solitary corals, although the exact shape can vary between species. Phaulactis is most easily identified by its large amount of septa, deep calyx and distinct internal structure with three clear areas with different properties (but  these sections are not always present in younger individuals). Another common trait is clear septal ridges.

species
Phaulactis angelini Wedekind, 1927
Phaulactis angusta Lonndsdale, 1839
Phaulactis clarkei Wedekind, 1927
Phaulactis cyathophylloides Ryder, 1926
Phaulactis gracile Wedekind, 1927
Phaulactis högklinti Wedekind 1927
Phaulactis iregularis Wedekind, 1927
Phaulactis tabulatum Wedekind, 1927
Phaulactis trochiformis McCoy, 1850
Phaulactis variabilis Kato et Ezaki, 1986

References

Stauriida
Rugosa
Prehistoric Anthozoa genera